Group L of the 2014–15 EuroChallenge was the third group of the Last 16 phase. It consisted of Enisey Krasnoyarsk, Port of Antwerp Giants, Trabzonspor Medical Park, and Belfius Mons-Hainaut. Play began on 13 January 2015 and ended 24 February.

Standings

References

Group K
2014–15 in Turkish basketball
2014–15 in Russian basketball
2014–15 in Belgian basketball